Sanjeh Bashi (also Romanized as Sanjeh Bāshī; also known as Sanjbāshi, Sanjeh Bāshe, and Sanjeh Vāsheh) is a village in Baqerabad Rural District, in the Central District of Mahallat County, Markazi Province, Iran. At the 2006 census, its population was 17, in 5 families.

References 

Populated places in Mahallat County